Kalausa Jnr Leha is a Tongan rugby footballer who currently plays rugby league for Toulouse Olympique in the Kingstone Press Championship.

Leha has previously played for the Parramatta Eels and Cronulla Sharks Holden Cup U20s Competition and also for Aurillac in the Rugby Pro D2.

From the age of 12 to 19 he was in the junior system of the Parramatta Eels.

References

External links
Toulouse Olympique profile
NRL profile
Wentworthville profile

1994 births
Tongan rugby league players
Toulouse Olympique players
Rugby league props
Living people
Tongan rugby union players